Fire It Up is the third studio album by American musician Rick James, released on October 16, 1979, on the Motown sub-label Gordy Records.  This album was certified gold by the RIAA, and between 1978 and 1982 was a period where Rick James established himself as the historical bridge between P-Funk and Prince.
Fire It Up was released on CD for the first time in 2010, by Universal Records. This item soon went out of print and has become a much sought after and very rare item for fans of Rick James and funk in general.

Track listing
All tracks composed by Rick James.

Side A
"Fire It Up" – 3:59
"Love Gun" – 5:44
"Lovin You Is a Pleasure" – 4:08
"Love in the Night" – 6:22

Side B
"Come into My Life" – 7:10
"Stormy Love" – 2:05
"When Love Is Gone" – 7:32

2010 Bonus Track / 2014 digital remaster bonus track / 2014 Complete Motown Albums bonus track
"Love Gun" (Promotional 12-Inch version) – 10:46

Personnel
Rick James – vocals, acoustic guitar, piano, organ, Harpsichord, timbales, timpani (tympani), electronic drums [syndrums], drums, percussion
The Stone City Band
Levi Ruffin – synthesizer, synthesizer (strings ensemble), percussion, backing vocals
Tom McDermott – electric guitar, twelve-string guitar, guitar (6-string), acoustic guitar
Greg Levias – keyboards, Fender Rhodes electric piano 
Danny LeMelle – alto saxophone, tenor saxophone, flute, harpsichord
Lanise Hughes – drums
Lorenzo Shaw — drums
Oscar Alston – bass guitar
Shondu Akiem – percussion, electronic drums (syndrums)
Cliff Ervin – trumpet, flugelhorn
John Ervin – trombone
Julia Waters, Maxine Waters, Pat Henderson, Jackie Ruffin, Lisa Sarna – backing vocals
California St. Clair, Cynthia Gable, Cynthia Nettles, Danny LeMelle, Jackie Ruffin, Julia Waters, Keith "Star" Ragin, Lisa Sarna, Maxine Waters, Pat Henderson, Tom McDermott, Winston L. Allen - choir on "Love in the Night"
John Cabalka - art direction
Ron Slenzak - photography

Charts

Singles

External links
 Rick James-Fire It Up at Discogs

References

1979 albums
Gordy Records albums
Rick James albums
Albums produced by Rick James